Vladimir Vukelic (born 8 August 1975) is a German lightweight rower. He won a gold medal at the 1996 World Rowing Championships in Motherwell with the lightweight men's eight.

He now works at Ruderklub am Wannsee as coach of the junior rowing squad.

References

1975 births
Living people
German male rowers
World Rowing Championships medalists for Germany